Artūrs or Arturs is a given name. Notable people with the name include:
Arturs Alberings (1876–1934), held the office as Prime Minister of Latvia from 7 May 1926 to 18 December 1926
Artūrs Bērziņš (born 1988), Latvian basketball player
Artūrs Garonskis (born 1957), Latvian former rower who competed for the Soviet Union in the 1980 Summer Olympics
Artūrs Irbe (born 1967), former Soviet and Latvian professional ice hockey goaltender
Artūrs Karašausks (born 1992), Latvian footballer
Arturs Krišjānis Kariņš (born 1964), Latvian politician
Artūrs Kulda (born 1988), Latvian professional ice hockey player
Artūrs Kupaks (born 1973), Latvian professional ice hockey player
Artūrs Kurucs (born 2000), Latvian basketball player
Artūrs Rubiks (born 1970), Latvian politician and the son of Alfrēds Rubiks
Artūrs Silagailis (born 1987), Latvian football defender
Artūrs Skrastiņš (born 1974), Latvian actor
Arturs Sproģis (1904–1980), Latvian colonel and commander of the Soviet partisans during the occupation of Latvia by Nazi Germany in World War II
Artūrs Štālbergs (born 1984), Latvian basketball player
Artūrs Strēlnieks (born 1985), Latvian basketball player
Artūrs Vaičulis (born 1990), Latvian footballer
Ārturs Vāvere (born 1965), Latvian sexologist
Artūrs Zakreševskis (born 1971), Latvian footballer
Artūrs Zjuzins (born 1991), Latvian football midfielder

Latvian masculine given names